Ellen Thomas (born January 24, 1947) is an American peace activist. She first became involved with the White House Peace Vigil on April 13, 1984. The daughter of a US Marine, Thomas was born in Brooklyn and grew up in California. She became opposed to nuclear weapons during her childhood. In protest at the policies of the United States government, she became a tax resister by simply living below the income tax threshold.

On May 6, 1984, Ellen Benjamin married Thomas in a Quaker wedding to become Ellen Thomas. Thomas and her husband protested together for a number of years, until his death in January 2009 of pulmonary disease.

Ellen also heads The Proposition One Non-Radioactive Nuclear Review, a traveling multimedia troupe that educates the public on the dangers of a nuclear future. In 1993 she helped coordinate the successful Washington DC ballot initiative for Nuclear Disarmament and Economic Conversion. Ellen formally served on the Washington Peace Center's board of directors, but has since moved to North Carolina.

The Oracles of Pennsylvania Avenue (2012) by Tim Wilkerson, a documentary commissioned by the Al Jazeera Documentary Channel, recounts the lives of William and Ellen Thomas, Concepción Picciotto and Norman Mayer.

See also
List of peace activists
Concepcion Picciotto
Brian Haw
Parliament Square Peace Campaign

References

External links
 Peace Park Website
 Oracles of Pennsylvania Avenue
 Washington Peace Center

American anti-war activists
American anti–nuclear weapons activists
Living people
American tax resisters
1947 births
American Quakers
Place of birth missing (living people)